Irsan Rahman Lestaluhu (born 4 August 1999) is an Indonesian professional footballer who plays as a left-back for Liga 1 club Borneo.

Club career

Madura United
In January 2018, Irsan signed a one-year contract with Madura United on a free transfer, when appearing for the first time with the team in a friendly match some time ago, Irsan has shown his brilliant ability. Irsan made his league debut in a 2–0 away lose against Badak Lampung on 1 December 2018 as a substitute for Andik Rendika Rama in the 82nd minute.

Loan to PSS Sleman
On 13 February 2019, Irsan joined PSS Sleman along with Rifad Marasabessy on loan from Madura United for the 2019 season.

Persiba Balikpapan
He was signed for Persiba Balikpapan to play in Liga 2 in the 2019 season. Irsan made his league debut on 27 August 2019 in an away win 0–1 against Persis Solo. Irsan scored his first league goal from a free-kick in first-half, against Sulut United on 6 September 2019. On 28 September 2019, Irsan scored again from free-kick in a 3–1 home win against PSBS Biak Numfor. Persiba's management revealed that Irsan would not renew his contract with the club at the end of December and officially left the club.

Borneo
On 19 March 2021, Irsan moved to Samarinda and joined Liga 1 side Borneo on free transfer. Irsan made his club debut in a pre-season 2021 Menpora Cup against PSM Makassar on 31 March 2021.

Loan to Persipura Jayapura
In June 2021, Irsan joined Persipura Jayapura on loan from Borneo for the 2021–22 season. Irsan made his league debut on 10 September 2021 in a match against Persela Lamongan.

International career
On 6 June 2017, Irsan made his debut against Scotland U20 in the 2017 Toulon Tournament in France. And Irsan is one of the players that strengthen  Indonesia U19 in 2017 AFF U-18 Youth Championship.

In October 2021, Irsan was called up to the Indonesia U23 in a friendly match against Tajikistan and Nepal and also prepared for 2022 AFC U-23 Asian Cup qualification in Tajikistan by Shin Tae-yong. On 22 October 2021, Irsan debuted in the under-23 team when he coming as a starter in a 2–0 win against Nepal U23.

Career statistics

Club

Notes

Honours

International 
Indonesia U-19
 AFF U-19 Youth Championship third place: 2017

References

External links
 Irsan Lestaluhu at Soccerway
 Irsan Lestaluhu at Liga Indonesia

1999 births
Living people
Indonesian footballers
Association football defenders
Indonesia youth international footballers
Liga 1 (Indonesia) players
Liga 2 (Indonesia) players
Persikabo Bogor players
Madura United F.C. players
PSS Sleman players
Persiba Balikpapan players
Borneo F.C. players
Persipura Jayapura players
People from Tulehu
Sportspeople from Maluku (province)
21st-century Indonesian people